Pigeon Tango is a 2017 Taiwanese crime thriller film written and directed by Lee Chi-yuarn. The film stars Sunny Wang, Annie Chen, Jason King, Liao Chun, Lu Yi-ching and Cecilia Choi.

Premise
To repay the gambling debts her boyfriend has left behind after a fatal pigeon racing accident, Barbie, a pole dancer, meets organ dealer Malacca, who extracts her deceased boyfriend's organs. Malacca becomes Barbie's lover in the process. Meanwhile, Yang, a detective, sets up a trap to capture Malacca.

Cast
 Sunny Wang as Malacca	 
 Annie Chen as Barbie
 Jason King as Ronin
 Liao Chun as Yang Kai-ming 
 Lu Yi-ching as San-feng 
 Cecilia Choi as Miu
 Yang Lie as Pan Wan-nien 
 Doris Yang as Lin Bai-hui

References

External links

2017 films
Taiwanese-language films
2017 crime thriller films
Taiwanese crime thriller films
Films about organ trafficking
2010s Mandarin-language films